Butyl butyrate, or butyl butanoate, is an organic compound that is an ester formed by the condensation of butyric acid and n-butanol.  It is a clear, colorless liquid that is insoluble in water, but miscible with ethanol and diethyl ether. Its refractive index is 1.406 at 20 °C.

Aroma
Like other volatile esters, butyl butyrate has a pleasant aroma.  It is used in the flavor industry to create sweet fruity flavors that are similar to that of pineapple.  It occurs naturally in many kinds of fruit including apple, banana, berries, pear, plum, and strawberry.

Safety
It is a marine pollutant. It mildly irritates the eyes and skin.

References

Butyrate esters
Flavors
Butyl compounds